Biidaban: First Light is a Canadian immersive virtual reality film, created by Lisa Jackson and released in 2018. The film places viewers in an immersive vision of a Downtown Toronto that has been reclaimed by nature, with vegetation and animals living freely inside the urban landscape, with narration in the indigenous Wendat, Mohawk and Ojibwe languages.

Jackson has indicated that the film is not meant to be perceived as apocalyptic, but as a meditation on the importance of humans living in harmony with nature to build a positive future. She created the film in conjunction with 3D artist Mathew Borrett, digital production agency Jam3 and the digital studio of the National Film Board of Canada.

The film premiered at the Tribeca Film Festival in April 2018. It received a special event screening at Nathan Phillips Square in September, before having its official Canadian premiere at the imagineNATIVE Film and Media Arts Festival.

Awards
At imagineNATIVE, the film won the award for Best Interactive Work. It won the Canadian Screen Award for Best Immersive Experience, Fiction at the 7th Canadian Screen Awards in 2019.

References

2018 films
Canadian Screen Award-winning films
Canadian short documentary films
First Nations films
Films set in Toronto
Films shot in Toronto
Virtual reality films
National Film Board of Canada short films
2010s Canadian films
2018 short documentary films